Bombaim is a small village on São Tomé Island in São Tomé and Príncipe. Its population is 18 (2012 census). It is 6 km south of Monte Café and 8 km southwest of Trindade. It was established as a plantation (roça).

Population history

References

Populated places in Mé-Zóchi District